The women's 80 metres hurdles was an event at the 1956 Summer Olympics in Melbourne, Australia.

Summary
The Australians again qualified three women to the final.  Shirley Strickland in lane 6 and Gloria Cooke in lane 1 sandwiched the field with a slight lead over the first barrier.  By the second barrier, Strickland had edged ahead while Cooke was getting competition from Gisela Köhler in lane 2 next to her.  By the next barrier, Köhler had some separation in second, while Galina Bystrova and Norma Thrower we battling for bronze in 4 and 5 respectively.  By the seventh hurdle, Strickland had a full metre on Köhler.  Almost a metre behind, Thrower had her head in front of Bystrova.  In between the final flight, Bystrova edged ahead.  Strickland won by almost two metres over Köhler, and behind on the run in from the last hurdle, Thrower managed to lean ahead for a microscopic advantage for bronze.

Final classification

References

External links
 Official Report
 Results

W
Sprint hurdles at the Olympics
1956 in women's athletics
Ath